The 2011 Tre Valli Varesine was the 91st edition of the Tre Valli Varesine, a single-day cycling race. The race started in Besozzo and finished in Campione d'Italia, in Varese, Lombardy. Davide Rebellin won the race (his first win since his 2008 suspension), beating Domenico Pozzovivo by four seconds.

Teams and riders
Five ProTour teams and Eleven Professional Continental teams were invited. Two Italian Continental teams completed the startlist.

The 18 teams invited to the race were:

Teams consisted of up to eight riders, and 178 riders started the event. The event took place two days after the conclusion of the 2011 Eneco Tour.

Results

 No points were received by ProTour teams

References

Tre Valli
Tre Valli Varesine